Bering Glacier is a glacier in the U.S. state of Alaska. Combined with the Bagley Icefield, where the snow that feeds the glacier accumulates, the Bering is the largest glacier in North America. The glacier is named after Vitus Bering.

Glacier retreat and earthquakes 

Warmer temperatures and changes in precipitation over the past century have thinned the Bering Glacier by several thousand meters. The Bering Glacier exhibits "surges", acceleration events of the flow rate of the glacier, every 20 years or so. During these periods the glacier terminus advances. The surges are generally followed by periods of retreat, so despite the periodic advances the glacier has been shrinking overall. Most glaciers along the Alaskan coast have been retreating along with the Bering Glacier.

The glacial retreat has an interesting side effect, an increase in the frequency of earthquakes in the region. The Wrangell and St. Elias mountain ranges that spawn the Bering Glacier were created by the collision of the Pacific and North American tectonic plates [the Pacific Plate is sliding underneath (being subducted by) the North American Plate]. The weight of the vast amount of ice in the Bering Glacier is enough to depress the Earth's crust, stabilizing the boundary between the two plates. As the glaciers lose mass, the pressure of the ice is diminished. This reduced compression allows the rocks along faults to move more freely, resulting in more earthquakes.

Meltwater at the terminus collects in Vitus Lake, which flows via the Seal River to the Gulf of Alaska.

See also
 List of glaciers
Retreat of glaciers since 1850

References

External links

 NASA Earth Observatory
  www.beringglacier.org
  CAC (Civil Applications Committee)/USGS Global Fiducials Program web page containing scientific description and interactive map viewer featuring declassified high-resolution time-series imagery

Glaciers of Alaska
Glaciers of Chugach Census Area, Alaska
Glaciers of Unorganized Borough, Alaska
Glaciers of Yakutat City and Borough, Alaska